Janklow is a surname. Notable people with the surname include:

Bill Janklow (1939–2012), American lawyer and politician
Morton L. Janklow (1930–2022), American literary agent